The Ahrens Building is a seven-story Romanesque Revival building in the Civic Center neighborhood of Manhattan, New York City. The building's design, by architect George Henry Griebel, blends polychrome brickwork, terra cotta and metal over a limestone base. The building was designated a New York City Landmark in 1992.

History
In 1879, liquor store owner Herman F. Ahrens purchased two properties at the corner of Elm and Franklin Streets from the William Briggs estate. The property contained two frame structures, a larger one at the corner (40 Franklin Street) and a smaller one facing Elm Street, where Ahrens moved his liquor store. In 1881, a municipal project to widen Elm Street would have forced the demolition of Ahrens' properties, leading him to develop the present-day Ahrens Building as a speculative development.

Construction was briefly halted, after union workers walked off the job after learning of non-union steamfitter workers were involved in construction of the building. The Sprague Electric company installed six elevators for the building on February 16, 1895.

The Ahrens Building remained in the Ahrens family until 1968, when Morris and Herbert Moskowitz acquired the property. After the sale of the building, the upper floors (which were used as storage space since the 1940s) were renovated back to office space. The ground floor has housed several bars and restaurant since the 1960s.

See also
List of New York City Designated Landmarks in Manhattan below 14th Street

References

Office buildings completed in 1895
New York City Designated Landmarks in Manhattan
Romanesque Revival architecture in New York City
Civic Center, Manhattan